Rockett may refer to:

Places
 Rockett, Texas, USA; an unincorporated community
 Rocketts Landing, Richmond, Virginia, USA; a neighborhood
 Rocketts Landing station bus station

People
 Dick Rockett (born 1931) Irish hurler
 Jason Rockett (born 1969) English soccer player
 Jushay Rockett (born 1984) U.S. basketball player
 Kevin Rockett, Irish film historian
 Marshe Rockett (born 1985) U.S. pro-wrestler
 Norman Rockett (1911-1996) U.S. film set artist
 Pat Rockett (born 1955) U.S. baseball player
 Rikki Rockett (born 1961) U.S. glam rocker of Poison

Groups
 The Rocketts, backup band for Wendy Stapleton

See also
 Rocket (disambiguation)
 Rockettes (disambiguation)